The Three Shire Stone is a boundary stone that marks the location where the historic English counties of Lancashire, Cumberland and Westmorland meet. The point is in the English Lake District at the summit of Wrynose Pass; latitude 54°25' North, longitude 3°7' West, elevation 1289 feet (393 m) above sea level.

The limestone monolith was cut in the Lancashire village of Cartmel in 1816 for the Furness roadmaster William Field; however, it was not erected until 1860, after his death. The front of the stone is inscribed with the word Lancashire. On the reverse side is the inscription W.F. 1816. It is grade II listed.

In 1997, the stone was smashed into four pieces, probably as the result of a motor accident. It was restored in 1998 by stonemason Gordon Greaves of Troutbeck Bridge. The unveiling ceremony of the restored monument took place on 27 April 1998. The possible loss of the stone prompted organisations, including Friends of Real Lancashire, to raise money for its restoration. The National Trust moved the car park away from the restored stone, and placed some cobbles in the turf to mark the county boundaries radiating from it.

The stone was found fallen and damaged in summer 2017. It is expected to take some time for the National Trust to repair it.

References

External links

Three Shire Stone at Lake District Tourism and Tourist Information

Border tripoints
History of Cumberland
History of Westmorland
History of Lancashire
Furness
Lake District